Loverboy is the fourth studio album by the American singer-songwriter Brett Dennen. It was released on April 12, 2011.

Track listing

2011 albums
Brett Dennen albums
Downtown Records albums